The Carrillo Puerto Formation is a geologic formation in Mexico. It preserves fossils dating back to the Late Miocene to Early Pliocene of the Neogene period.

Fossil content 
Various fossils have been found in the formation:

Fishes 

 Carcharodon hastalis
 Galeocerdo sp.
 Hemipristis serra
 Megalodon

Mammals 

 Corystosiren varguezi
 Dioplotherium sp.
 Nanosiren cf. garciae
 Xenosiren yucateca

See also 

 List of fossiliferous stratigraphic units in Mexico

References 

Geologic formations of Mexico
Neogene Mexico
Limestone formations
Fossiliferous stratigraphic units of North America
Paleontology in Mexico